Delmotte is a surname.

List of people with the surname 

 Christophe Delmotte (born 1969), Franco-Belgian former professional footballer
 Fernand Delmotte (1920–1998), Belgian politician
 Hans Delmotte (1917–1945), Belgian SS Officer
 Henri Delmotte (1822–1884), Belgian playwright, librettist and novelist
 Gabriel Delmotte (1876–1950) was a French astronomer
 Roger Delmotte (born 1925), French classical trumpeter
 Nicolas Delmotte (born 1978), French show jumping competitor
 Valerie Masson-Delmotte, French climate scientist

See also 

 Delmotte (crater)
 Stade Gustave-Delmotte
 Del Monte (disambiguation)

Surnames
Surnames of Belgian origin
Surnames of French origin